"Repeat After Me (Interlude)" is a song by Canadian singer the Weeknd from his fourth studio album After Hours. It was released on March 20, 2020, alongside the rest of its parent album as the twelfth track. The Weeknd wrote the song along with producers Kevin Parker and Oneohtrix Point Never.

Lyrics
"Repeat After Me" is the only interlude on the After Hours album and its lyrics feature Abel beckoning his lover to repeat after him, which essentially brainwashes them into loving him the break-up of the duo and the girl is with someone new.

Critical reception
The song received widespread critical acclaim. According to the Billboard, "Repeat After Me (Interlude)" was ranked the eleventh best song from the After Hours album as according to its reception, the track combines psychedelic energy — thanks to Kevin Parker of Tame Impala who handles the production — with bass-heavy trap rhythms. While trap is a staple in The Weeknd’s music at this point, sometimes, it feels like a crutch but this particular hip-hop transition is welcome, as it continues to infuse the airy, experimental sound.

Commercial performance
Following the releasing of its parent album, "Repeat After Me (Interlude)" charted at number 69 on the US Billboard Hot 100 along with the other fellow After Hours tracks dated April 4, 2020. It was the thirteenth highest charting track from the album. Also, it charted at number 62, 130, 81, 32 and 31 on the Canadian Hot 100, France, Portugal, Hot R&B/Hip-Hop Songs and Rolling Stone Top 100 respectively.

Personnel
 The Weeknd – vocals, songwriting
 Kevin Parker – songwriting, production
 Daniel Lopatin – songwriting, production
 Shin Kamiyama – engineering
 Matt Cohn – engineering, mixing 
 Dave Kutch – mastering
 Kevin Peterson – mastering

Charts

Release history

References

The Weeknd songs
Songs written by the Weeknd
2020 songs
Song recordings produced by Kevin Parker (musician)
Songs written by Kevin Parker (musician)
Songs written by Oneohtrix Point Never